Pternoconius is an extinct genus of macraucheniid  litoptern from the Late Oligocene and Early Miocene of Argentina. Fossils of this genus have been found in the Sarmiento Formation of Argentina.

Etymology 
The genus name, Pternoconius, is an anagram of the closely related genus Coniopternium. The species name refers to the similarity of the Eocene genus Polymorphis.

Species

Pternoconius tournoueri 
In 1985, fossils found in the Early Miocene Colhué Huapí Member of the Sarmiento Formation were assigned to the genus under the name Pternoconius tournoueri, consisting of a nearly complete hemimandible.

Pternoconius bondi 
In 2016 a new species of macraucheniid litoptern was described coming from the Bajada del Diablo locality in the Sarmiento Formation, consisting of the anterior portion of the skull with the maxillary region, some fragments of nasal bones, a small  portion of the left zygomatic process, and most of the upper dentition (i.e., left P2–M3, right C, and right P1–M3). The species was named after Mariano Bond, in recognition of his contributions to the knowledge of South American native ungulates.

Classification 
Pternoconius is  a member of the subfamily Cramaucheniinae within the family Macraucheniidae. However, many studies have suggested that Cramaucheniinae is a paraphyletic group. This suggestion was further corroborated in phylogenetic analyses of the family in 2014 and 2018, which found that Cramaucheniinae is a paraphyletic group, and that Theosodon is a sister clade to the subfamily Macraucheniinae, the least primitive of the members of Cramaucheniinae. 

The results of McGrath et al. 2018 are shown below.

References 

Macraucheniids
Miocene mammals of South America
Oligocene mammals of South America
Colhuehuapian
Deseadan
Neogene Argentina
Paleogene Argentina
Fossils of Argentina
Fossil taxa described in 1983
Prehistoric placental genera
Golfo San Jorge Basin
Sarmiento Formation